Narotam "Tom" Puna (28 October 1929 – 7 June 1996) was a New Zealand cricketer who played in three Tests in 1966.

Life and career
Puna's family migrated from India to New Zealand when he was eight. He was a fixture in the Northern Districts side from 1956–57 to 1968–69, beginning as a middle-order batsman but descending the order as his off-spin bowling developed. His best innings figures were 6 for 25 against Otago in Hamilton in 1966–67 (match figures of 59–29–66–9). When he retired he was Northern Districts' leading wicket-taker, with 223.

He took 34 wickets at 13.70 in the Plunket Shield in the 1965–66 season, and was selected as New Zealand's principal spinner in all three Tests against the visiting England team later that season, but achieved little.

His sons Ashok and Kirti also played for Northern Districts.

References

External links
 Tom Puna at Cricket Archive
 Tom Puna at Cricinfo

1929 births
1996 deaths
New Zealand Test cricketers
New Zealand cricketers
Northern Districts cricketers
Cricketers from Surat
Indian emigrants to New Zealand